Thomas Mooney (31 October 1910 – 15 December 1981) was a Scottish footballer, who played for Airdrieonians, Newcastle United and Greenock Morton. He also represented the Scottish League.

References

External links
Newcastle Players Me - Mu toonarama.co.uk

1981 deaths
1910 births
Newcastle United F.C. players
English Football League players
Airdrieonians F.C. (1878) players
Airdrieonians F.C. (1878) wartime guest players
Partick Thistle F.C. wartime guest players
Greenock Morton F.C. players
Royal Albert F.C. players
Scottish Junior Football Association players
Scottish Football League players
Scottish Football League representative players
Scottish footballers
Footballers from Glasgow
Association football wingers